Johnson v. Eisentrager, 339 U.S. 763 (1950), was a major decision of the US Supreme Court, where it decided that US courts had no jurisdiction over German war criminals held in a US-administered prison in Germany. The prisoners had at no time been on American sovereign territory.

This decision was weakened by the Court's ruling in Braden v. 30th Judicial Circuit Court (1973), when the court found that the key to jurisdiction was whether the Court could process service to the custodians. Braden was relied on by the Court in Rasul v. Bush (2004), in which it held that it did have jurisdiction over the detainees held at Guantanamo Bay detention camp because it could reach their custodians, the policymakers and leaders of the Bush administration, who were responsible for their detention.

Facts 
On May 8, 1945, the German High Command executed an act of unconditional surrender, expressly obligating all forces under German control at once to cease active hostilities and therefore ending the European Theater of World War II. The prisoners had been convicted in China by an American military commission of violating the laws of war, by engaging in, permitting, or ordering continued military activity against the United States after surrender of Germany and before surrender of Japan. They were transported to the American-occupied part of Germany and imprisoned there in the custody of the US Army. Claiming that their trial, conviction, and imprisonment violated Articles I and Article III, the Fifth Amendment, and other provisions of the US Constitution, laws of the United States, and provisions of the Geneva Conventions, they petitioned the District Court for the District of Columbia for a writ of habeas corpus directed to the Secretary of Defense, the Secretary of the Army, and several officers of the Army having directive power over their custodian.

The US government argued:
 A non-resident enemy alien has no access to US courts during wartime.
 The non-resident enemy aliens, captured and imprisoned abroad, have no right to a writ of habeas corpus in a court of the United States. (See Ex parte Quirin)
 The Constitution does not confer a right of personal security or immunity from military trial and punishment upon an alien enemy engaged in the hostile service of a government at war with the United States. (In this section, the Army quoted the Geneva Conventions, implicitly recognizing that the prisoners had rights and obligations under them.)

Decision 
In their ruling, the Supreme Court justices noted (emphasis added and footnotes removed):

Aftermath 
Eisentrager and his 20 codefendants were all released from prison early, later in 1950.

See also
List of United States Supreme Court cases, volume 339
Ex Parte Milligan
Ex Parte Quirin
Hamdi v. Rumsfeld
Rasul v. Bush
Rumsfeld v. Padilla
Hamdan v. Rumsfeld
Boumediene v. Bush

Notes

External links
 

Extrajudicial prisoners of the United States
United States Supreme Court cases
United States habeas corpus case law
1950 in United States case law
United States Fifth Amendment case law
Geneva Conventions
United States Nuremberg Military Tribunals
United States Supreme Court cases of the Vinson Court